Dudley Allen may refer to:

 Dudley Peter Allen (1852–1915), American surgeon, writer and art patron
 T. Dudley Allen (1829–1924), American architect